The Church of St. Alban, Roxborough is a parish of the Episcopal Diocese of Pennsylvania in the Roxborough neighborhood of Philadelphia, Pennsylvania. It was founded in 1859 as a chapel of ease of St. David's Episcopal Church in Manayunk, initially with a dedication to St. Peter. The cornerstone for the church building was laid on September 15, 1860, and the church was consecrated by Bishop William Bacon Stevens on January 14, 1862, as his first official episcopal act, having himself been consecrated to the episcopate six days earlier. Its architect was Alfred Byles, who also designed the Fifth Baptist Church at the corner of Eighteenth and Spring Garden in Philadelphia.

During the twentieth century, St. Alban's was nicknamed "Roxborough's Little Church Around the Corner," a reference to the Church of the Transfiguration in New York City as a small and uncharacteristically open parish.

The tracker action organ at St. Alban's is Hook & Hastings Opus 1750 from 1897. Several of the church's stained glass windows are by Paula Himmelsbach Balano (1877-1967), a German-American church artist working in a medium uncommon for women at the time of her installations. The sanctuary is designed to accommodate ad orientem celebration.

During the COVID-19 pandemic, St. Alban's began and maintained a regimen of daily Morning Prayer from the Book of Common Prayer broadcast on Facebook. The parish is a supporter of the St. James School at the former Church of St. James the Less in East Falls. It is part of the Wissahickon Deanery of the Diocese of Pennsylvania.

The parish's current rector is the Rev. Paul Adler, a graduate of Princeton Theological Seminary and member of the Society of Catholic Priests.

Notable parishioners and clergy 
First Lieutenant Joshua Simster Garsed (1839-1863), Union Army casualty at the Battle of Gettysburg
Charles R. Hale (1837-1900), liturgist, theologian, ecumenist, and coadjutor bishop of the Episcopal Diocese of Springfield from 1892 to 1900.

See also 
St. David's Episcopal Church, Manayunk
St. Timothy's Episcopal Church, Roxborough
St. Peter's Episcopal Church of Germantown
St. Alban's Episcopal Church, Newtown Square
St. Alban's Church, Olney

External links 
Official parish website
Pipe organ database
Parish History of the Church of St. Alban, Roxborough (1859-1949) from Philadelphia Studies
Study of the Episcopal Diocese of Pennsylvania: Church of St. Alban, Roxborough (1964) from Philadelphia Studies
Parish Profile of the Church of St. Alban, Roxborough (1978) from Philadelphia Studies
The Annals of St. David's, Manayunk
Episcopal Diocese of Pennsylvania

1859 establishments in Pennsylvania
Christian organizations established in the 1850s
Churches in Philadelphia
Episcopal Church in Pennsylvania
Religious organizations established in 1859
19th-century Episcopal church buildings